"Miss You Love" is a song by the Australian rock band Silverchair. It was released as the third single from their 1999 album Neon Ballroom. AllMusic critic Jason Anderson called the song a weepy ballad reminiscent of Goo Goo Dolls.

Background
The song was written when Daniel Johns was suffering from severe depression among other things. In an interview with Kerrang! magazine, Johns said that the song was "about not being able to establish a relationship with anyone, not being able to experience love outside of family". He also said that he "wanted a song that people could perceive as a love song, while the lyrics are actually very angry".

The song appeared in the 2000 Australian film Looking for Alibrandi, although it was not included on the official soundtrack.

Track listing
Australian CD single (MATTCD091)
 "Miss You Love"
 "Wasted"
 "Fix Me"
 "Minor Threat"
 "Ana's Song (Open Fire)" (live video)

European CD single (6677682); Australian cassette (MATTC091)
 "Miss You Love"
 "Wasted"
 "Fix Me"
 "Minor Threat"

"Wasted" and "Fix Me" are 2 covers of the hardcore punk band Black Flag and "Minor Threat" is a cover song by the band Minor Threat.

A vinyl version of the single seems to have been pressed in Italy but never issued.

Charts

Certification

References

1999 singles
Silverchair songs
Songs written by Daniel Johns
Song recordings produced by Nick Launay
1999 songs
Murmur (record label) singles